Grombalia  Airfield is an abandoned World War II military airfield in Tunisia, which is located approximately  east-southeast of Hammam-Lif, about  southeast of Tunis. It was a temporary airfield constructed by Army Engineers using Pierced Steel Planking (PSP) for its runway, parking and dispersal areas, not designed for heavy aircraft or for long-term use.

It was used by the United States Army Air Force Twelfth Air Force 82d Fighter Group during the North African Campaign, flying P-38 Lightnings from the airfield between August and October 1943.

After the Americans moved east in October, the airfield was closed and dismantled. Today, the former main runway is visible in aerial photography, however no buildings or physical features remain.

References

 Maurer, Maurer. Air Force Combat Units of World War II. Maxwell AFB, Alabama: Office of Air Force History, 1983. .

External links

Airfields of the United States Army Air Forces in Tunisia
Airports established in 1943